Benjamin Stasiulis (born 20 July 1986) is a French swimmer. He has competed at the 2008 and 2012 Summer Olympics.

Career
At the 2008 Olympics, he competed in the men's 100 m backstroke, failing to reach the semifinals, and swam the backstroke leg for the French 4 × 100 m relay team, which failed to qualify for the final.

At the 2012 Summer Olympics he finished 31st overall in the heats in the Men's 100 metre backstroke and failed to reach the semifinals.  He also failed to progress from the heats of the men's 200 m backstroke.

Personal life
Stasiulis is of Lithuanian descent from his father's side.

References

1986 births
Living people
Swimmers at the 2013 Mediterranean Games
European Aquatics Championships medalists in swimming
French male freestyle swimmers
French people of Lithuanian descent
French male backstroke swimmers
Mediterranean Games gold medalists for France
Olympic swimmers of France
Swimmers at the 2008 Summer Olympics
Swimmers at the 2012 Summer Olympics
Mediterranean Games medalists in swimming